Gornje Leskovice is a village in the municipality of Valjevo, Serbia. According to the 2002 census, the village has a population of 463 people.

Notable people
Serbian soldier Stojadin Mirković (1972–1991) was born in the village

References

Populated places in Kolubara District